John Warwick Iredale (born 1 August 1999) is an Australian professional soccer player who plays as a forward for German  club SV Wehen Wiesbaden.

Club career
Iredale is a former youth academy player of Sydney FC. He made his senior debut for the club on 2 August 2017 in a 8–0 cup win against Darwin Rovers.

On 26 August 2021, SV Wehen Wiesbaden announced the signing of Iredale on a season long loan deal. He made his professional debut for the club on 28 August in a 4–2 league defeat against 1. FC Magdeburg.

On 2 August 2022, Iredale returned to SV Wehen Wiesbaden on a permanent basis and signed a two-year contract with the club.

International career
Iredale is a current Australian youth international. He was member of the team which reached quarter-finals at the 2018 AFC U-19 Championship. On 30 August 2018, he received his first call-up to the senior team for a training camp which was held in Turkey.

Career statistics

References

External links
 

1999 births
Living people
Association football forwards
Australian soccer players
Australia youth international soccer players
Soccer players from Sydney
3. Liga players
Regionalliga players
Sydney FC players
SC Paderborn 07 players
SV Wehen Wiesbaden players
Australian expatriate soccer players
Australian expatriate sportspeople in the Netherlands
Australian expatriate sportspeople in Germany
Expatriate footballers in the Netherlands
Expatriate footballers in Germany